Extreme event attribution, also known as attribution science, is a relatively new field of study in meteorology and climate science that tries to measure how ongoing climate change directly affects recent extreme weather events. Attribution science aims to determine which such recent events can be explained by or linked to a warming atmosphere and are not simply due to natural variations.

History
Attribution science was first mentioned in a 2011 "State of the Climate" published by the American Meteorological Society which stated that climate change is linked to six extreme weather events that were studied.

Purpose, methods and findings
German climatologist Friederike Otto posited that attribution science aims to answer the question, "did climate change play a role" in specific extreme events "within the news time frame – so within two weeks of the event". 

Attribution studies generally proceed in four steps: (1) measuring the magnitude and frequency of a given event based on observed data, (2) running computer models to compare with and verify observation data, (3) running the same models on a baseline "Earth" with no climate change, and (4) using statistics to analyze the differences between the second and third steps, thereby measuring the direct effect of climate change on the studied event. 

Heatwaves are the easiest weather events to attribute.

Climate change can affect the intensity and frequency of extreme weather differently, for example the 2010 Russia heat wave was made far more likely but not more intense.

Applications and implications
Attribution science may affect climate change litigation, perhaps by increasing lawsuits against companies for causing and governments for not addressing climate change.

Examples 
 A review summarized confidence, probabilities and costs-severities – such as economic costs, financial costs and number of early losses of life – of links to climate change and identified potential ways for the improvement of the field such as "improving the recording of extreme weather impacts around the world, improving the coverage of attribution studies across different events and regions, and using attribution studies to explore the contributions of both climate and non-climate drivers of impacts."
 Scientists of the international World Weather Attribution project publicized a study that found that human-caused climate change had an influence on the 2019–20 Australian wildfires by causing high-risk conditions that made widespread burning at least 30 percent more likely. They comment on the results, stating that climate change probably had more effects on the fires which couldn't be attributed using their climate simulations and that not all drivers of the fires showed imprints of anthropogenic climate change.
 The World Weather Attribution initiative has attributed the 2021 Western North America heat wave to climate change.
 Further analyses can be found on the WWA's website.
 The Climate Attribution Database contains scientific resources organized by theme.
 A study of 2020 storms of at least tropical storm-strength published in Nature Communications concluded that human-induced climate change increased extreme 3-hourly storm rainfall rates by 10%, and extreme 3-day accumulated rainfall amounts by 5%. For hurricane-strength storms, the figures increased to 11% and 8%.

 As of October 2022, the United States had been affected by 15 weather/climate disaster events, each with losses surpassing $1 billion.

See also 
 Climate change mitigation#Drivers of global warming
 Climate justice
 Economics of climate change
Effects of climate change

References

External links 

 Climate Attribution
 World Weather Attribution

Climate change assessment and attribution